Tephritoresta debilis is a species of tephritid or fruit flies in the genus Tephritoresta of the family Tephritidae.

Distribution
Togo.

References

Tephritinae
Insects described in 1942
Diptera of Africa